"Burnt Out Car" is a single by Saint Etienne. The release of London Conversations was eventually delayed to February.

"Burnt Out Car" was originally slated to be a single in 1996 and remixes were commissioned. The release was eventually dropped but the Balearico Mix surfaced on the Casino Classics remix collection and the Continental album. The original mix was not released until 2006, when it appeared on the outtakes collection Nice Price.

The track was re-recorded and produced by the Xenomania team for the 2008 release. The single was backed by three b-sides spanning the 7" and CD single as well as a remix by Mark Brown.

Track listing 

All tracks written and composed by Stanley and Wiggs; except where indicated.

1996 release

2008 release

References

Saint Etienne (band) songs
2009 singles
Song recordings produced by Xenomania
Songs written by Bob Stanley (musician)
Songs written by Pete Wiggs
2008 songs
Heavenly Recordings singles